Sky Dive is the twentieth album by jazz trumpeter Freddie Hubbard, recorded in 1972.  It was his fourth album released on Creed Taylor's CTI label and features performances by Hubbard, Keith Jarrett, George Benson, Ron Carter, Billy Cobham, Airto Moreira and Ray Barretto.

Track listing
 "Povo" (Hubbard) - 14:46
 "In a Mist" (Bix Biederbecke) - 7:05
 "Naturally" (Nat Adderley) - 5:56 Bonus track on CD
 "The Godfather (Theme)" (Nino Rota) - 7:23
 "Sky Dive" (Hubbard) - 7:37
 "Naturally" [Alternate Take] - 5:03 Bonus track on CD

Personnel
Freddie Hubbard - trumpet
Alan Rubin, Marvin Stamm - trumpet, flugelhorn
Wayne Andre, Garnett Brown - trombone 
Paul Faulise - bass trombone
Tony Price - tuba
Hubert Laws - flute, alto flute, bass flute
Phil Bodner - flute, alto flute, bass clarinet, piccolo
George Marge - alto clarinet, bass clarinet
Wally Kane - bass clarinet, piccolo
Romeo Penque - flute, alto flute, clarinet, oboe, English horn
Keith Jarrett - piano, electric piano
George Benson - guitar
Ron Carter - bass
Billy Cobham - drums
Ray Barretto, Airto Moreira - percussion
Don Sebesky - arranger, conductor

References

Freddie Hubbard albums
1973 albums
Albums conducted by Don Sebesky
Albums arranged by Don Sebesky
Albums produced by Creed Taylor
Albums recorded at Van Gelder Studio
CTI Records albums